Events from the year 1766 in art.

Events
 July 19 – A baronetcy is created for British sculptor Henry Cheere.
 England's oldest surviving Georgian theatre is constructed in Stockton-on-Tees.
 The Drottningholm Palace Theatre is reopened as an opera house in Stockholm, Sweden, in its surviving form, designed by Carl Fredrik Adelcrantz.
 Denis Diderot's Essais sur la peinture is published.

Works

 Thomas Gainsborough – Portrait of David Garrick with a bust of Shakespeare (probably originally painted; lost)
 Jean-Antoine Houdon – Bruno of Cologne (sculpture for Santa Maria degli Angeli e dei Martiri in Rome)
 Maruyama Ōkyo – Crows
 Allan Ramsay – Portrait of David Hume
 Joseph Wright of Derby – A Philosopher Lecturing on the Orrery

Births
 March 1 – Johann Conrad Felsing, German topographer and engraver using stippling (died 1819)
 March 2 – Thomas Henry, French painter and art patron (died 1836)
 March 16 – Jean-Frédéric Waldeck, artist and explorer (died 1875)
 April 1 – François-Xavier Fabre, French painter of historical subjects (died 1837)
 April 6 – Wilhelm von Kobell, German painter, printmaker and teacher (died 1853)
 September 16 – Jes Bundsen, Danish architectural and landscape painter and etcher (died 1829)
 October 14 – Friedrich Carl Gröger, north-German portrait painter and lithographer (died 1838)
 December 22 – Johann Samuel Arnhold, German painter in oil and water-colours, and on porcelain and enamel (died 1827)
 December 25 – Samuel Drummond, British painter especially portraits and marine genre works (died 1844)
 date unknown
 Pierre-Charles Bridan, French sculptor (died 1836)
 Mariano Gerada, sculptor and woodworker (died 1823)

Deaths

 January 7 – Giacomo Boni, Italian painter (born 1688)
 January 19 – Giovanni Niccolò Servandoni, French architect and painter (born 1695)
 March 4 – Joseph Aved, also called le Camelot (The Hawker) and Avet le Batave (The Dutch Avet), French Rococo portraitist (born 1702)
 May 5 – Olof Arenius, Swedish portrait painter (born 1701)
 June 22 – Carlo Zimech, Maltese priest and painter (born 1696)
 July 17 – Giuseppe Castiglione, Italian Jesuit Brother, missionary in China, painter at the court of the Emperor (b. 1688)
 July 18 – Mauro Antonio Tesi, Italian painter of the late-Baroque period, active mainly in Bologna (b. 1730)
 August 13 – Margaret Fownes-Luttrell, English heiress and painter (b. 1726)
 November 7
Vincenzo Meucci, Italian painter whose patrons included Anna Maria Luisa de' Medici (b. 1694)
Jean-Marc Nattier, French painter (b. 1685)
 date unknown
 Antonio Consetti, Italian historical painter (b. 1686)
 William Elliott, English engraver (born 1727)

References

 
Years of the 18th century in art
1760s in art